Aaron Joseph Neville (born January 24, 1941) is an American R&B and soul singer. He has had four platinum albums and four Top 10 hits in the United States, including three that reached number one on Billboard's Adult Contemporary chart. "Tell It Like It Is", from 1966, also reached the top position on the Soul chart for five weeks.

He has also recorded with his brothers Art, Charles and Cyril as the Neville Brothers and is the father of singer/keyboards player Ivan Neville. Neville is of mixed African-American, Caucasian, and North American Indigenous (Choctaw) heritage.

Career
The first of his singles that was given airplay outside of New Orleans was "Over You" (Minit, 1960). Neville's first major hit single was "Tell It Like It Is", released on a small New Orleans label, Par-Lo, co-owned by local musician/arranger George Davis, a friend from school, and band-leader Lee Diamond. The song topped Billboards R&B chart for five weeks in 1967 and also reached  on the Billboard Hot 100 (behind "I'm a Believer" by the Monkees). It sold over one million copies, and was awarded a gold disc. It was not the label's only release, as some sources claim. At least five other Par-Lo singles, three of them by Neville himself, are known to exist.

Neville released his first solo album since the late 1960s in 1986 with the independent release Orchid in The Storm. In 1989, Neville teamed up with Linda Ronstadt on the album Cry Like a Rainstorm, Howl Like the Wind which included four duets by the pair. Amongst them were the No. 1 Grammy-winning hits "Don't Know Much" and "All My Life". "Don't Know Much" reached No. 2 on the Hot 100, and was certified Gold for selling a million copies, while the album was certified Triple Platinum for US sales of more than three million.

Following the success of Cry Like a Rainstorm, Howl Like the Wind, Ronstadt produced his 1991 album Warm Your Heart including the hit single "Everybody Plays the Fool", a cover of the 1972 Main Ingredient song, which reached No. 8 on the Billboard Hot 100 and another duet with Ronstadt "Close Your Eyes". Warm Your Heart was certified platinum in 1997 for more than a million sales in the U.S.

During 1993 and 1994, Neville expanded his repertoire as a recording artist and ventured into making country music. In 1993, Neville released the platinum-selling The Grand Tour on A&M Records with lead single "Don't Take Away My Heaven" reaching No. 4 on the Adult Contemporary chart (where previous hits "Don't Know Much", "All My Life", and "Everybody Plays the Fool" all reached number one). The follow-up single "The Grand Tour", a cover of country music legend George Jones' 1974 hit, peaked at No. 38 on the Billboard country singles chart, and was highly acclaimed by fans and critics, resulting in a nomination for the Grammy Award for Best Male Country Vocal Performance at the 36th Annual Grammy Awards in 1994. He followed the album up with another platinum seller Aaron Neville's Soulful Christmas.

Neville's next country music project involved appearing on 1994's Rhythm, Country and Blues, an album of duets featuring R&B and Country artists performing renditions of classic country and R&B songs. Neville recorded a version of "I Fall to Pieces", a major crossover hit for Patsy Cline originally released in 1961, with Trisha Yearwood that resulted in Neville and Yearwood winning the Grammy Award for Best Country Collaboration with Vocals at the 37th Annual Grammy Awards. As a result, Neville became one of the only African American recording artists to win a Grammy within the Country genre.
In April 1994, Neville appeared on Sesame Street  to sing the song "I Don't Want to Live on the Moon" as a duet with Ernie.

Aaron's 1995 R&B flavored release, The Tattooed Heart, featuring covers of classics by Bill Withers and Kris Kristofferson went gold, while 1997's pop-orientated ...To Make Me Who I Am included songwriting contributions from contemporary hitmakers Babyface and Diane Warren as well as two new duets with Ronstadt, including a cover of "The First Time Ever I Saw Your Face". This was followed by a 2000 gospel album Devotion which topped the US gospel album chart, and his 2003 debut for Verve Records entitled Nature Boy: The Standards Album which topped the US jazz album chart. The album saw Neville covering selections from the Great American Songbook, including another Ronstadt duet "The Very Thought of You".

In August 2005, his home in Eastern New Orleans was destroyed by Hurricane Katrina; he evacuated to Memphis, Tennessee, before the hurricane hit. He initially went to Austin temporarily visiting his friend Clifford Antone, then moved to Nashville, Tennessee, after the storm. and, failing to return to the city by early 2008, caused the New Orleans Jazz and Heritage Festival to temporarily change its tradition of having the Neville Brothers close the festival. However, the Neville Brothers, including Aaron, returned for the 2008 Jazzfest, which returned to its traditional seven-day format for the first time since Katrina. He then decided to move back to the New Orleans area, namely the North Shore city of Covington. Neville performed Randy Newman's "Louisiana 1927" during NBC's A Concert for Hurricane Relief on September 2, 2005.

Neville signed to SonyBMG's new Burgundy Records label in late 2005 and recorded an album of songs by Otis Redding, Marvin Gaye, Curtis Mayfield, Sam Cooke and others for Bring It On Home...The Soul Classics, released on September 19, 2006. The album, produced by Stewart Levine, features collaborations between Neville and Chaka Khan, Mavis Staples, Chris Botti, David Sanborn, Art Neville, and others. The album's first single was a remake of The Impressions' 1963 classic "It's All Right".

Neville's career has included work for television, movies and sporting events. Neville sang the US national anthem in the movie The Fan starring Robert De Niro and Wesley Snipes. He also sang the anthem at the WWF's SummerSlam 1993 and at WCW's Spring Stampede 1994. Neville sang the theme music to the children's TV series Fisher-Price Little People. He also sang a new version of "Cotton", for Cotton Incorporated which was introduced during the 1992 Summer Olympics. In 1988 he recorded "Mickey Mouse March" for Stay Awake: Various Interpretations of Music from Vintage Disney Films, one of Various Artists. In 2006, Neville performed a rendition of "The Star-Spangled Banner", alongside Aretha Franklin and Dr. John on keyboards at Super Bowl XL in Detroit, Michigan. In addition, Neville (along with brothers Art and Cyril) did background vocals for the songs "Great Heart", "Bring Back the Magic", "Homemade Music", "My Barracuda", and "Smart Woman (in a Real Short Skirt)" on Jimmy Buffett's Hot Water, released in 1988.

Neville is interviewed on screen and appears in performance footage with the Neville Brothers in the 2005 documentary film Make It Funky!, which presents a history of New Orleans music and its influence on rhythm and blues, rock and roll, funk and jazz. The Nevilles perform "Fire on the Bayou" in the film.

On October 27, 2006, Neville made a guest appearance on an episode of the soap opera The Young and the Restless. He sang "Stand by Me" and "Ain't No Sunshine", from his album, Bring It On Home ... The Soul Classics. In 2008 he released Gold, which includes a double album of his hits.

In 2008 Neville's song Christmas Prayer was featured on ER (TV Series). In ER (season 15) episode The High Holiday. 

In 2009, Neville, along with the Mt. Zion Mass Choir, released a version of the song "A Change Is Gonna Come" on the compilation album Oh Happy Day.

In 2010, Neville and his brother Art performed with The Meters.

Neville was the featured artist for the 100th Anniversary Celebration of the University of Memphis Centennial Concert September 30, 2011, at the Cannon Center for the Performing Arts.

In 2011, Neville, along with The Blind Boys of Alabama and Mavis Staples had toured New Zealand.

In January 2013, paying tribute to the songs of his youth, Blue Note Records released Neville's My True Story, a collection of 12 doo-wop tunes, produced by Don Was and Keith Richards, with backing by musicians such as Benmont Tench and Tom Petty and the Heartbreakers.

In March 2015, he was named the year's recipient of the Laetare Medal.

In October 2015, Keith Richards selected the song "My True Story" as one of his Desert Island Discs.

In May 2021, the 80-year old Neville announced his retirement from touring, but said he may still record albums or perform occasionally for special events or festivals.

Personal life
Neville is from New Orleans, Louisiana. He has mixed African-American, Caucasian, and Native American (Choctaw) heritage. His uncle, George "Big Chief Jolly" Landry, was lead singer of the Mardi Gras Indian group the Wild Tchoupitoulas.

Neville got his facial tattoo (of a sword) when he was 16 years old. Speaking to Billboard in 2019, he recalled that "My dad made me scrub it with Brillo Pads and Octagon Soap. The skin came off, but the tattoo stayed. But some years later, I had an album out called The Tattooed Heart [in 1995], and we were doing a special thing in a tattoo parlor, so I let them go over it and outline it - freshen it up."

Neville married Joel (pronounced Jo-EL ) Roux Neville (1941–2007) on January 10, 1959. Together they had four children Ernestine, Ivan, Aaron "Fred", and Jason Neville.

In 2008, during a People magazine photo shoot, Neville met photographer Sarah A. Friedman, who had been hired to take a portrait of the Neville Brothers. Neville and Friedman were married on November 13, 2010, in New York City at the restaurant Eleven Madison Park.

Neville's oldest son, Ivan, is also a musician and released an album, If My Ancestors Could See Me Now, in 1988 which yielded a Top 40 hit with "Not Just Another Girl". Ivan has also performed with Spin Doctors, the Rolling Stones and Bonnie Raitt, and played keyboards for Keith Richards on his first solo tour. Ivan then assembled his own band (Ivan Neville's Dumpstaphunk) which tours and frequently appears in New Orleans.

Neville's third son, Jason, is a vocalist and rap artist who has performed with his father and with the Neville Brothers, notably at the 2009 New Orleans Jazz and Heritage Festival.

Neville is the uncle of journalist and Fox News personality Arthel Neville.

Neville is Catholic, with a devotion to St. Jude, to whom he has credited his success and survival. He wears a St. Jude Medal as a left earring.

Discography

Studio albums

Compilation albums
Greatest Hits (1990)
The Very Best of Aaron Neville (2000)
20th Century Masters - The Millennium Collection: The Best of Aaron Neville (2002)
Brother to Brother (2003)
Love Songs (2003)
Aaron Neville & Friends Sky Blue Music (2007)
Gold (2008)

Singles

A "It's All Right" peaked at #12 on Hot Contemporary Jazz Songs.

Guest singles

Music videos

Awards and honors
 32nd Grammy Awards : Best Pop Performance by a Duo or Group with Vocal : "Don't Know Much" with Linda Ronstadt (winner)

 33rd Grammy Awards : Best Pop Performance by a Duo or Group with Vocal : "All My Life" with Linda Ronstadt (winner)

 34th Grammy Awards : Best Male Pop Vocal Performance : Warm Your Heart (nominee)

 36th Grammy Awards : Best Male Pop Vocal Performance : "Don't Take Away My Heaven" (nominee)

 36th Grammy Awards : Best Male Country Vocal Performance : "The Grand Tour" (nominee)

 37th Grammy Awards : Best Country Collaboration with Vocals : "I Fall To Pieces" with Trisha Yearwood (winner)

 41st Grammy Awards : Best Traditional R&B Performance : To Make Me Who I Am (nominee)

 65th Grammy Awards: Best American Roots Performance: "Stompin' Ground" with Dirty Dozen Brass Band (winner)

Filmography
Zandalee (1991)
The Fan (1996)
Boycott (2001)
Sandy Wexler (2017) Netflix
Linda Ronstadt: The Sound of My Voice (2019)

References

External links

Aaron Neville.com
Official Neville Brothers website
Aaron Neville at RollingStone.com
Aaron Neville at NPR Music

1941 births
African-American Catholics
African-American country musicians
African-American musicians
American people of Choctaw descent
American Roman Catholics
American soul musicians
American gospel singers
Bell Records artists
Grammy Award winners
Living people
Neville family (show business)
Rhythm and blues musicians from New Orleans
The Neville Brothers members
Ballad musicians
Minit Records artists
A&M Records artists
EMI Records artists
Laetare Medal recipients
21st-century African-American people
20th-century African-American people